Belinda Bencic defeated Liudmila Samsonova in the final, 1–6, 7–6(10–8), 6–4 to win the singles tennis title at the 2023 Abu Dhabi Open. It was her eighth career WTA Tour-level singles title. She saved three championship points en route to the title.

Aryna Sabalenka was the reigning champion, when the tournament was last held in 2021, but chose not to compete this year.

Seeds 
The top four seeds received a bye into the second round.

Draw

Finals

Top half

Bottom half

Qualifying

Seeds

Qualifiers

Lucky losers

Qualifying draw

First qualifier

Second qualifier

Third qualifier

Fourth qualifier

Fifth qualifier

Sixth qualifier

References

External links 
 Main draw
 Qualifying draw

Abu Dhabi Open
Abu Dhabi Women's Tennis Open